Montgomery Township is an inactive township in Montgomery County, in the U.S. state of Missouri.

Montgomery Township was established in 1872, taking its name from Montgomery City, Missouri.

References

Townships in Missouri
Townships in Montgomery County, Missouri